Sadabad (also Romanized as Sa‘dābād) is a village in Mardehek Rural District, Jebalbarez-e Jonubi District, Anbarabad County, Kerman Province, Iran. At the 2006 census, its population was 1,294, in 265 families.

References 

Populated places in Anbarabad County